Auon'tai M. "Tay" Anderson (born July 5, 1998) is an American  politician and community organizer from Denver, Colorado. A member of the Democratic Party, he is serving as one of the Directors of the Denver Public Schools Board of Education since 2019. In September 2021, he was censured by the board for "behavior unbecoming of a board member" following an investigation of allegations against him.

Early life and education
Anderson was born to Mia Anderson, a single mother who was a teenager when he was born. He grew up in Kansas City, Kansas, and moved to Denver to attend high school. He attended two other schools before settling on Manual High School, where he later became student body president. While at Manual, he decided to run to become a Director of the Denver Public Schools Board of Education. At the time he was 19 years old, thus becoming the youngest person to date to run for a Denver school board.

Anderson lost that election, and instead enrolled at Metropolitan State University of Denver to study education and also began working in restorative justice within Denver Public Schools. He decided to run for the Board of Education again in 2019, campaigning on supporting low-performance schools, putting a pause on approving new charter schools, and reforming how punishment was conducted at schools. Anderson decisively won this election, and doing so ushered in Denver's first anti-reform, pro-union school board in over a decade. In a three-way race, he won about 51% of the total vote. He is one of the youngest elected officials in Colorado history, being just 21 at the time of his inauguration.

Early career

Anderson graduated from Manual High School in 2017. His professional experience includes working as a restorative practice coordinator at Denver North High School. He is affiliated with March for Our Lives - Colorado.

Political career

Anderson was inaugurated into the Denver School Board on December 4, 2019. The following January, Anderson helped pass a mandate requiring all Denver Public Schools to designate a gender-neutral bathroom, saying it would support the LGBT community. Additionally, Anderson has led an effort to remove the Denver Police Department from public schools within the city. Anderson was a de facto leader of Denver's George Floyd protests. He is a member of the Democratic Socialists of America.

Allegations of sexual assault 
On March 26, 2021, Denver's Black Lives Matter affiliate, Black Lives Matter 5280, issued a statement saying a woman approached the organization in the previous month and reported that Anderson sexually assaulted her. The woman's name was not revealed in the statement, but she requested a public apology from Anderson and asked that he "seek help from a licensed professional with relevant expertise." Anderson issued a statement a day later denying the allegations. BLM5280 said Anderson "will not be welcome to share space with BLM5280 physically or on any of our platforms." After it released its initial statement, BLM5280 said "multiple" additional alleged victims had approached the organization to report that Anderson sexually assaulted them too. Anderson again denied wrongdoing, but told Westword magazine that "although I would have never intended for anyone to feel unsafe or uncomfortable around myself or others, I deeply apologize to the women-identifying members of NAC for the impact of my actions."

On May 28, 2021, Denver Public Schools acknowledged that their board and the Denver Police Department were aware of new allegations of sexual assault against Anderson. Testimony before the Colorado State House Judiciary Committee on May 25 alleged the existence of a serial sexual predator within the school district, without naming Anderson specifically. Shortly thereafter police and the school district indicated they had been informed that the accusations were against Anderson specifically.

After a third-party investigation was conducted, the allegations were determined to be unsubstantiated, while finding "behavior unbecoming of a board member". The originator of the allegations refused to corporate with the investigation, and her spokesperson, Brooks Flemings, was deemed to be not a credible witness. The investigation determined that Flemings had “inconsistencies in her story, used inappropriate humor and timed her report for Sexual Assault Awareness Month.” Ultimately, no victims came forward, and no one was found to corroborate Fleming’s testimony. The Denver school board voted 6-1 to censure Anderson for his behavior. Anderson was the sole vote in opposition to the measure, which was the first time the board had censured one of its own members.   Over 1000 students walked out of classrooms in protest of Anderson remaining on the board.

References

1998 births
Living people
21st-century American politicians
African-American people in Colorado politics
African-American school board members
Black Lives Matter people
Candidates in the 2017 United States elections
Colorado Democrats
Democratic Socialists of America politicians from Colorado
People from Kansas City, Kansas
Politicians from Denver
Politicians from Kansas City, Kansas
School board members in Colorado